The Ballerina Stakes is a Grade I American Thoroughbred horse race for fillies and mares that are three years old or older over a distance of seven furlongs on the dirt track scheduled annually in August at Saratoga Race Course in Saratoga Springs, New York. The event currently carries a purse of $500,000.

History

The inaugural running of the Ballerina Stakes was 20 August 1979 and was won by the Ogden Phipps-owned three-year-old filly Blitey, who was ridden by the US Hall of Fame jockey Ángel Cordero Jr. on a muddy track in a time of 1:23. 
The race is named for Howell E. Jackson's filly, Ballerina, who won the 1954 inaugural running of the Maskette Stakes, run today as the Grade I Go For Wand Handicap.

In 1981 the event was classified as Grade III, upgraded to Grade II in 1984 and to Grade I in 1988. The sudden rise in stature of the event was due to the quality of runners who won this event and continued to win important Grade I races. In particular the winner of the second running in 1980 was the 1979 US Champion Three-Year-Old Filly Davona Dale, the 1983 winner Ambassador of Luck who went onto become the US Champion Older Dirt Female Horse and Lady's Secret, the 1985 winner as a three-year-old, who in the following year would win the Breeders' Cup Distaff.

The only dual winner of the event, Shine Again failed by a nose to win a third time as a six-year-old when she was beaten by the 13-1 outsider Harmony Lodge in 2003.

The event continues to be a part of the Breeders' Cup Challenge series with the winner of the Ballerina Stakes automatically qualifying for the Breeders' Cup Filly & Mare Sprint.

Records
Speed  record:
7 furlongs: 1:21.09 –  Lady Talk  (2004)

Margins:
 lengths – Hilda's Passion (2011)

Most wins:
 2 – Shine Again (2001, 2002)

Most wins by a jockey:
 5 – John Velazquez (2005, 2012, 2015, 2016, 2021)

Most wins by a trainer:
 5 – C. R. McGaughey III (1984, 1988, 1991, 1994, 1999)

Most wins by an owner:
 2 – Ogden Phipps (1979, 1999)
 2 – Eugene V. Klein (1985, 1986)
 2 – Kinsman Stable (1993, 2000)
 2 – Bohemia Stable (2001, 2002)

Winners

Notes:

§ Ran as an entry

See also
List of American and Canadian Graded races

References

Graded stakes races in the United States
Horse races in New York (state)
Sprint category horse races for fillies and mares
Grade 1 stakes races in the United States
Recurring sporting events established in 1979
Saratoga Race Course
Breeders' Cup Challenge series
1979 establishments in New York (state)